Saint-Bonnet-de-Chavagne is a commune in the Isère department in southeastern France. The 13th-18th century Château de l'Arthaudière is situated in the commune.

Population

See also 
 Communes of the Isère department

References 

Communes of Isère
Isère communes articles needing translation from French Wikipedia